Apsiou is a village in the Limassol District of Cyprus, located 2 km east of Gerasa.

References

Communities in Limassol District